John Harris (– Spring 1772) was a farmer, land surveyor and political figure in Nova Scotia. He represented Annapolis County in the Nova Scotia House of Assembly from 1762 to 1770 and  Granville Township from 1770 to 1772.

He came to Nova Scotia from Massachusetts and was one of the first people granted land in Annapolis County following the expulsion of the Acadians in 1755. Harris was a crown lands surveyor. He was elected to the provincial assembly in a 1762 by-election held after the death of John Steele. He died in office.

References 
 A Directory of the Members of the Legislative Assembly of Nova Scotia, 1758–1958, Public Archives of Nova Scotia (1958)

1772 deaths
Nova Scotia pre-Confederation MLAs
Year of birth unknown